Maryse Lesieur (born 27 February 1950) is a French football player who played as defender for French club  Stade de Reims of the Division 1 Féminine.

International career

Lesieur represented France in the first FIFA sanctioned women's international against the Netherlands on April 17, 1971.

Personal life

Maryse Lesieur was married to Pierre Geoffroy the founder of Stade de Reims Féminines.

References

1950 births
Stade de Reims Féminines players
French women's footballers
France women's international footballers
Division 1 Féminine players
Women's association football midfielders